In Search of Sunrise 5: Los Angeles is the fifth compilation album in the In Search of Sunrise series mixed by Dutch trance producer and DJ Tiësto, released on 25 April 2006 in the Netherlands. It was mixed while Tiësto was on holiday with his friend BT in Los Angeles in February 2006. The packaging contains a special slipcase that is printed with metallic foil. It was certificated Gold in Canada for sales over 50,000 copies. It also charted, peaking 34 in Canada and 59 in Austria.

In Search of Sunrise 5: Los Angeles consists of songs that are mainly from the progressive trance or progressive house genre of electronic dance music.

Track listing

 Late Night Alumni - "Empty Streets (Haji & Emanuel Remix)" there was no credit given to Haji & Emanuel for the remix in the booklet or back cover
 A.M. - "Arise (Exclusive Hammer & Funabashi Remix)" is an exclusive version to ISOS and the vinyl sampler, it is not the same remix that is on the regular 12" release
 Cass Fox - "Little Bird" was later released as Deep Skies' "Little Bird (Mike Koglin Remix)"
Conil - "Malibu Beach" is a song by Tiësto under the name of Conil, made only for this compilation.

 Smith & Pledger present Aspekt - "Hi Jack (Instrumental)" it is not a credited instrumental version, but does credit Carrie Skipper as a vocalist as there is a vocal version of the song

Personnel
Compiling, mixing – Tiësto
Mastering – Barney Broomer

Charts and certifications

Weekly charts

Year-end charts

Certifications

References

External links

Tiësto compilation albums
2006 compilation albums